The 2021–22 Mississippi Valley State Delta Devils basketball team represented Mississippi Valley State University during the 2021–22 NCAA Division I men's basketball season. The Delta Devils were led by third-year head coach Lindsey Hunter for the first 25 games of the season and by interim head coach George Ivory for the final three games of the season. They played their home games at the Harrison HPER Complex in Itta Bena, Mississippi as members of the Southwestern Athletic Conference. They finished the season 2–26, 2–13 in SWAC play to finish in last place. They failed to qualify for the SWAC tournament. 

On February 24, 2022, head coach Lindsey Hunter was placed on paid administrative leave for an unspecified period of time. Former MVSU player and Arkansas–Pine Bluff coach George Ivory was named interim coach for the remainder of the season. On March 11, Hunter resigned as head coach. Three days later, the school officially removed the interim tag and named Ivory the team's new head coach.

Previous season 
In a season limited due to the ongoing COVID-19 pandemic, the Delta Devils finished the 2020–21 season 2–22 overall, 2–13 in SWAC play to finish in last place.

Roster

Schedule and results  

|-
!colspan=12 style=| Non-conference regular season

|-
!colspan=9 style=| SWAC regular season

Source

References 

Mississippi Valley State Delta Devils basketball seasons
Mississippi Valley State
Mississippi Valley State Delta Devils
Mississippi Valley State Delta Devils